Little Duck may refer to:

Little Duck Creek (South Hyco Creek tributary)
Little Duck Key, an island of the Florida Keys
Little Duck Organics, a food industry company
Little Duck River, a tributary of the larger Duck River in Tennessee, US
"Little Duck", a song by Don Patterson from the 1966 album Goin' Down Home
The protagonists of the children's song "Five Little Ducks"
Little Duck, a film by electronic musician James Murphy
Adina, a fictional character and the "little duck" to which the title Dulcamara, or the Little Duck and the Great Quack refers

See also
Little White Duck (disambiguation)